The Kyrgyz Air Force is the official air force of the Armed Forces of the Kyrgyz Republic. Its current commander is Colonel Kylychbek Aidaraliev. The official holiday of the air forces is Aviation Day on August 18.

History 
The military aviation in the Kyrgyz SSR dates back to December 1941. Kyrgyzstan's air arm was inherited from the central Soviet Air Force training school (now the Military Institute of the Armed Forces of the Kyrgyz Republic). This presented the nation a fleet with several L-39s, some dismantled MiG-21s, Mi-8s and Mi-24s. However, only a few L-39s and some helicopters are capable of flight. All aircraft are reportedly based at Kant, alongside the Russian 999th Air Base.

Because of expense and military doctrine, Kyrgyzstan has not developed its air capability; a large number of the MiG-21 interceptors that it borrowed from Russia were returned in 1993, although a number of former Soviet air bases remain available. In 1996, about 100 decommissioned MiG-21s remained in Kyrgyzstan, along with ninety-six L-39 trainers and sixty-five helicopters. The air defence forces have received aid from Russia, which has sent military advisory units to establish a defence system. The Russians also help patrol Kyrgyz airspace as part of the   Joint CIS Air Defence System Presently Kyrgyzstan has twenty-six SA-2 and SA-3 surface-to-air missiles in its air defence arsenal. In 2002, the Kyrgyz government allowed the United States to use Manas air base for support operations in the War on terror. This agreement lasted till June 2014.

The Air Defense Forces were created by the decree of President Kurmanbek Bakiyev on July 27, 2006. On its 11th anniversary in 2017, it was presented with its battle banner. In August 2019, the 60th anniversary of military aviation in the nation was celebrated by the air force, holding an air parade in the Chüy Region.

Structure 
 Air Force HQ (Bishkek)
 5th Guards Independent Anti-Aircraft Missile Brigade (Bishkek)
 11th Air Defense Brigade (Osh)
 44th Independent Radio Engineering Battalion (Grigor'yevka)
 Frunze-1 Air Base (Bishkek)
 Central Command Post of the Northern Group of Forces (Bishkek)

Aircraft

Current inventory

Retired
Previous aircraft operated by the Air Force consisted of the L-39 Albatros, MiG-21, MiG-23, MiG-29, An-12 and the Tupolev Tu-134

References 

Military of Kyrgyzstan
Air forces by country
air force
Military aviation in Asia